Rockville High School may refer to a school in the United States:

Rockville High School (Connecticut), a high school in Vernon, Connecticut
Rockville High School (Maryland), a high school in Rockville, Maryland
Rockville High School (Indiana), a high school in Rockville, Indiana